The Hessisches Staatsarchiv Marburg (HStAM, "Hessian State Archives in Marburg") is one of the three archives of the Hessisches Landesarchiv and is based in Marburg upon Lahn.

References 

Marburg Hessian StateArchives
Marburg
Marburg Hessian StateArchives